Timon is an unincorporated community in Natchitoches Parish, Louisiana, United States.

Unincorporated communities in Natchitoches Parish, Louisiana
Unincorporated communities in Louisiana
Populated places in Ark-La-Tex